Elva Mai Hoover is a Canadian actress. She is best known for her performance as Betty Fox in The Terry Fox Story, for which she garnered a Genie Award nomination for Best Supporting Actress at the 5th Genie Awards, in 1984, and her television roles as Mrs. Edison in The Edison Twins and Mrs. Lawson in Road to Avonlea.

She has also had guest and supporting roles in other films and television series, but worked primarily as a stage actor, most notably as painter Anne Langton in Molly Thom's The Bush-Ladies.

Hoover is the mother of writer Gemma Files, through her marriage to Australian actor Gary Files.

Selected filmography

Film

Television

References

External links
 

Canadian television actresses
Canadian film actresses
Canadian stage actresses
Canadian voice actresses
Living people
Year of birth missing (living people)